The China Wave: Rise of a Civilizational State is a 2011 book by Zhang Weiwei about China's economic and geopolitical rise to the status as an emerging global power.  It was originally published in Chinese with the English language version being published in 2012. In the book Zhang argues that China's rapid economic development proves the success of China's model of governance and exceptionalism. Zhang argues that China is unique and exceptional because it is a civilization state. A concept that Zhang outlines in the book and that he feels challenges Western assumptions about human rights, good governance, and democracy.

References

External links 

  – Al Jazeera News (Aired: 14 Jan 2012).

Further reading 
Coker, Christopher. The Rise of the Civilizational State. John Wiley & Sons, 2019.

Chinese non-fiction books
Books about international relations
2012 non-fiction books
Society of China
Books about geopolitics
Century (imprint) books